Hardeman County is a county located in the U.S. state of Tennessee. As of the 2020 census, the population was 25,462. Its county seat is Bolivar.

History
Hardeman County was created by the Tennessee General Assembly in 1823 from parts of Hardin County and "Indian lands." It is named for Thomas J. Hardeman (1788-1854), a veteran of the Creek War and War of 1812 and a prominent figure in the fight for Texas independence. He served as a congressman in the Republic of Texas. 

The county is the location of two of Tennessee's four private prisons, the Whiteville Correctional Facility and the Hardeman County Correctional Center. Both are medium-security facilities for men, operated by the Corrections Corporation of America.

Geography
It is the fifth-largest county in Tennessee by area.

Adjacent counties

Madison County (north)
Chester County (northeast)
McNairy County (east)
Alcorn County, Mississippi (southeast)
Tippah County, Mississippi (south)
Benton County, Mississippi (southwest)
Fayette County (west)
Haywood County (northwest)

National protected areas
Hatchie National Wildlife Refuge

State protected areas
Chickasaw State Park (part)

Demographics

2020 census

As of the 2020 United States census, there were 25,462 people, 8,891 households, and 5,816 families residing in the county.

2010 census
As of the census of 2010 the racial makeup of the county was 56.1% White (non-Hispanic) or European American, 41.01% Black or African American, 0.24% Native American, 0.29% Asian, 0.01% Pacific Islander, 0.2% from other races, and 0.79% from two or more races.  0.96% of the population were Hispanic or Latino of any race.

2000 census
As of the census of 2000, there were 28,105 people, 9,412 households, and 6,767 families residing in the county. The population density was 42 people per square mile (16/km2). There were 10,694 housing units at an average density of 16 per square mile (6/km2). The racial makeup of the county was 57.34% White (non-Hispanic) or European American, 40.97% Black or African American, 0.26% Native American, 0.31% Asian, 0.02% Pacific Islander, 0.30% from other races, and 0.79% from two or more races. 0.97% of the population were Hispanic or Latino of any race.

There were 9,412 households, out of which 32.60% had children under the age of 18 living with them, 50.00% were married couples living together, 17.60% had a female householder with no husband present, and 28.10% were non-families. 25.10% of all households were made up of individuals, and 11.40% had someone living alone who was 65 years of age or older. The average household size was 2.56 and the average family size was 3.06.

In the county, the population was spread out, with 23.90% under the age of 18, 9.80% from 18 to 24, 31.30% from 25 to 44, 22.40% from 45 to 64, and 12.60% who were 65 years of age or older. The median age was 36 years. For every 100 females there were 116.90 males. For every 100 females age 18 and over, there were 121.40 males.

The median income for a household in the county was $29,111, and the median income for a family was $34,746. Males had a median income of $27,828 versus $20,759 for females. The per capita income for the county was $13,349. About 16.90% of families and 19.70% of the population were below the poverty line, including 24.40% of those under age 18 and 20.80% of those age 65 or over.

Schools
Bolivar Central High School
Bolivar Middle School
Bolivar Elementary School
Whiteville Elementary School
Middleton High School
Middleton Elementary School
Toone Elementary School
Grand Junction Elementary School
Hornsby Elementary School

Communities

Cities
Bolivar (county seat)

Towns

Grand Junction (partial)
Hickory Valley
Hornsby
Middleton
Saulsbury
Silerton (partial)
Toone
Whiteville

Unincorporated communities
Forty Five
Pocahontas
Van Buren
Cloverport

Politics

Apart from its powerful vote against Hubert Humphrey in 1968 and George McGovern in 1972 as well as George H. W. Bush's 21-vote plurality in 1988, Hardeman County was a solidly Democratic county up until it flipped to Donald Trump in 2016.

See also
National Register of Historic Places listings in Hardeman County, Tennessee
John Chisum
Bailey Hardeman, brother of Thomas J. Hardeman
Hardeman County, Texas

References

External links

 Chamber of Commerce site 

Hardeman County at Tennessee Encyclopedia of History and Culture

 
1823 establishments in Tennessee
Populated places established in 1823
West Tennessee